Qatar and the United Arab Emirates (UAE) share a naval border and are part of the Arabic-speaking Persian Gulf region. They are both members of the GCC.

On 5 June 2017, as part of the Qatar diplomatic crisis, the UAE cut diplomatic relations with Qatar. On 6 January 2021, Qatar and the UAE agreed to fully restore diplomatic ties.

Diplomatic visits

Visits by Qatar 
In March 2016, Sheikh Tamim bin Hamad Al Thani visited Abu Dhabi and met with Sheikh Mohammed bin Zayed Al Nahyan.

Visits by United Arab Emirates 
In 2008, the president of the UAE, Sheikh Khalifa bin Zayed Al Nahyan, visited Doha where he met Sheikh Hamad bin Khalifa Al Thani, Amir of Qatar. The two leaders set up a joint investment fund.

On 28 November 2014, Sheikh Mohammed bin Zayed Al Nahyan, crown prince of Abu Dhabi, visited Doha and met with Sheikh Tamim bin Hamad Al Thani.

History

Hamad bin Khalifa Al Thani Coup d'état 

In 1995, after Hamad bin Khalifa Al Thani deposed his father to become emir of Qatar, UAE granted asylum to the deposed Khalifa bin Hamad Al Thani in a quarters in Abu Dhabi. Sheikh Zayed bin Sultan Al Nahyan tried to mediate between the father and his son, and advised Khalifa bin Hamad to congratulate his son.

The coup affair was revived in 2018 after the Qatar diplomatic crisis with Al Jazeera broadcasting documentaries of new details accusing UAE, along with Saudi Arabia, Bahrain, and Egypt, of plotting to overthrow Hamad bin Khalifa Al Thani and reinstating his father Khalifa bin Hamad Al Thani. According to the documentary, a former French army commander Paul Barril was contracted and supplied with weapons by the UAE to carry out the coup operation in Qatar. UAE minister of foreign affairs Anwar Gargash responded to the documentary and stated that Paul Barril was in fact a security agent of Sheikh Khalifa bin Hamad Al Thani who visited Abu Dhabi and had no relationship with the UAE and the documentary was a falsification to inculpate the UAE.

2014 Riyadh Agreement 
The UAE, along with Saudi Arabia and Bahrain, withdrew their ambassador from Qatar in March 2014 due to alleged failure by Qatar to abide by an agreement not to interfere in the politics of these countries. The main reason for the dispute was UAE's support for the political regime in Egypt led by Abdel Fattah el-Sisi and Egypt's military elite which contrasted Qatar's support for the democratically elected Muslim Brotherhood.

The government of Qatar continued to back the Muslim Brotherhood in Egypt, and Qatar's emir Tamim bin Hamad Al Thani denounced el-Sisi's election as president in June 2014 as a ‘military coup’. The ambassadors returned to their posts in June.

In September 2014, it was reported that the Emirati government invested $3 mn into a lobbying campaign against Qatar, primarily as a response to Qatar's support for the Muslim Brotherhood. The campaign was aimed at influencing American journalists to publish critical articles of Qatar's alleged funding of Islamist groups. Qatar has also been accused of influencing news outlets to report unfavorably on the UAE.

It was claimed by journalist Brian Whitaker that the UAE used Global Network for Rights and Development, an NGO to which it has ties, as a political tool. Whitaker claimed that the organization showed favoritism in its 2014-human rights index by ranking UAE at 14 and Qatar at 97. The organization has also taken an opposing stance towards Qatar's hosting of the 2022 FIFA World Cup over human rights concerns. Two of the organization's employees were arrested by Qatari authorities in 2014 while they were investigating the living standards of foreign laborers.

Second Libyan Civil War 

The second Libyan Civil War has been described as a proxy conflict between the two countries, with the UAE backing the secular Tobruk government and Qatar backing the Islamist National Salvation Government.

2017–2021 Qatar diplomatic crisis 

On 5 June 2017, the UAE, along with Saudi Arabia, Egypt and Bahrain, severed ties with Qatar, accusing it of supporting terrorism. This was precipitated by messages broadcast by the Qatar News Agency in May 2017 which criticized Saudi Arabia and cast Iran and the Muslim Brotherhood in a positive light. Qatar denied that it was responsible for the messages, claiming that its news agency was hacked. The four aforementioned countries censored all Qatari news outlets as part of severing diplomatic ties.

In addition to severing ties on 5 June, the UAE also expelled all Qatari nationals living in the Emirates and prohibited its citizens from travelling to Qatar. Furthermore, the UAE closed off its airspace and territorial waters to Qatari vessels.

According to Islam Hassan, a research analyst in Georgetown University in Qatar, "there has been always competition between al-Nahyans of Abu Dhabi and al-Thanis of Qatar. This competition goes back to the 1800s. The Arab uprisings ushered a new chapter in the Qatari–Emirati competition. The competition led to the Emiratis playing a major role in the withdrawal of ambassadors from Qatar in 2014. At the beginning of the current diplomatic crisis, particularly after the hacking saga, UAE was trying to maintain the problem. Yet, Al Jazeera's publishing of Yousuf al-Otaiba's leaked emails got the UAE on board with Saudi Arabia."

In two separate incidents, on 21 December 2017 and 3 January 2018, the UAE was accused by Qatar's government of infringing on its airspace with fighter jets. As a result, two complaints were filed to the UN by Qatar's representative Alya bint Ahmed Al Thani. For their part, the UAE rebuked the allegations, claiming that it had never impeached on Qatar's airspace with warplanes.

On 14 January, Qatari Sheikh Abdullah bin Ali Al-Thani, reportedly released a video in which he claimed he was being detained in the UAE by Emirati authorities after being invited to the country by Mohammed bin Zayed Al Nahyan. Emirati authorities denied that he was being forcefully held stating that he was in the country “at his own behest”. According to UAE authorities, "Sheikh Abdullah had expressed his desire to leave the UAE following which all measures were taken to honour his desire without any reservation".

Another air traffic-related incident occurred on 15 January 2018, when the UAE accused Qatar of 'intercepting' two civilian airliners en route to Bahrain with fighter jets. This was quickly denied by Qatari government officials.

During the 2019 Asian Cup semifinal match between Qatar and the tournament host United Arab Emirates, the UAE supporters threw bottles and footwears into the pitch. This conduct was preceded by booing the Qatari national anthem. Qatar won 4–0 despite the situation, paving way to their first Asian Cup final and eventual title.

On 12 November 2019, the UAE decided to participate in the 24th Arabian Gulf Cup, which is being hosted by Qatar, after boycotting it earlier. According to analysts, the participation from the UAE signaled that the feud between the countries might come to an end soon.

On 6 January 2021, Qatar and UAE agreed to fully restore diplomatic ties.

The Misfits 2021
The film has been controversial in Qatar after its release owing to some real life negative references to Qatar to "terror" financing and explicit references to Muslim Brotherhood as "terrorists" with Yusuf al-Qaradawi as their mastermind. A documentary by Al Jazeera, released in August 2021, revealed the United Arab Emirates actively funded the American movie.

QatarGate Scandal
In December 2022, Qatar was alleged of running influence campaigns in the European Parliament. However, Qatar denied any wrongdoing, and accused the UAE of orchestrating the scandal against it. A European Union correspondent Jack Parrock confirmed that everyone in the Qatari government believes that the Emirates planned the alleged bribery case against Qatar. Later, a report by Italian news website, Dagospia reported that the UAE national security adviser Tahnoun bin Zayed gave tips to Belgium, which opened the probe against Qatar.

Energy
Qatar, Oman, and the United Arab Emirates are linked by the Dolphin Gas Project, which is the Gulf Cooperation Council's first cross-border refined gas transmission project. The project is developed and operated by Dolphin Energy, a company established in Abu Dhabi. It is the operator of all upstream, midstream, and downstream phases of the project. Dolphin Energy is 51% owned by Mubadala Development Company, on behalf of the Government of Abu Dhabi, and 24.5% each owned by Total S.A. of France and Occidental Petroleum of the United States. During the Qatar diplomatic crisis and the severing of relations between the two countries, the pipelines continued operations.

In March 2019, Qatar lodged a complaint to International Atomic Energy Agency regarding the United Arab Emirates Barakah nuclear power plant, stating that it poses a serious threat to regional stability and the environment. The UAE denied that there are safety issues with the plant, which is being built by Korea Electric Power Corporation (KEPCO), and stated “The United Arab Emirates ... adheres to its commitment to the highest standards of nuclear safety, security and non-proliferation.”

References

 
United Arab Emirates
Bilateral relations of the United Arab Emirates